BMW p/b Happy Tooth Dental (UCI code BMW) was a professional women's cycling team, based in the United States of America, which competed in elite women's road bicycle racing events in 2015.

Team Roster
2015 Roster. Ages as of 1 January 2015.

Major wins
2015
1st Stage 2 (ITT) Redlands Bicycle Classic, Rhae-Christie Shaw

References

Defunct cycling teams based in the United States
UCI Women's Teams
Cycling teams established in 2015
Cycling teams disestablished in 2015